The Mayoral election of 1981 in Pittsburgh, Pennsylvania was held on Tuesday, November 3, 1981. The incumbent mayor, Richard Caliguiri of the Democratic Party chose to run for his second full term.

Results
Caliguiri won by a particularly large margin, eclipsing 80% of the vote, a figure that even surpasses the city's heavily Democratic voter registration advantage. This is in part due to the particularly polarizing nature of Republican candidate Fred Goehringer, a KDKA broadcaster. Goehringer was a Barry Goldwater admirer but campaigned against Caligiuri's Renaissance III corporate benefits, alienating some GOP power brokers. A total of 83,683 votes were cast.

References

1981 Pennsylvania elections
1981 United States mayoral elections
1981
1980s in Pittsburgh
November 1981 events in the United States